Labidochromis shiranus is a species of cichlid endemic to Lake Malawi where it is only known to occur along the western coast of the southeastern arm of the lake.  This species can reach a length of  SL.  It can also be found in the aquarium trade.

References

shiranus
Fish of Malawi
Fish of Lake Malawi
Fish described in 1982
Taxonomy articles created by Polbot